WNCA (1570 AM) is a radio station broadcasting a news/talk format. Licensed to Siler City, North Carolina, United States, the station is owned by Chatham Broadcasting. WNCA offers Swap-Shop, Local News, local sports, obituaries, Adult contemporary music, and Beach music for the Siler City area.

References

External links
FCC History Cards for WNCA

NCA
Radio stations established in 1952
1952 establishments in North Carolina